Christian Felske is a German car designer who is credited with the Volkswagen BlueSport concept.

References

German automobile designers
Living people
Year of birth missing (living people)